Allons is an unincorporated community in Overton County, Tennessee, United States. The community ZIP code is 38541. It is concentrated along State Route 52 (Celina Highway) north of Livingston.

History
Allons may be derived from the French meaning "to gather around". A post office has been in operation at Allons since 1896.

Notes

Unincorporated communities in Overton County, Tennessee
Unincorporated communities in Tennessee